Springman Records is an independent record label founded in 1998 by Avi Ehrlich that was run out of his parents' garage in Cupertino, California, until late 2005, when Ehrlich moved the label to Sacramento. The label's official slogan is "Friendly Punks" though many other styles of music appear on the label, such as indie rock, rockabilly, ska, folk music, pop punk, and hardcore.

In 2007, Springman stopped releasing albums, but launched Silver Sprocket, a bicycle club that also releases records with a more collective and community-oriented philosophy.  Silver Sprocket members jokingly refer to themselves as a cult on their Myspace page.

The group has been involved in political and community-related projects around Sacramento.  As an imprint, Silver Sprocket has released albums, clothing, toys, and art-related projects.

Now based in Ehrlich's San Francisco Victorian, Silver Sprocket's business side works with numerous bands and graphic artists, including Mitch Clem of the Nothing Nice To Say webcomic to release his merchandise and managing his record label, Face Palm Records.

Roster
 
 Amazing Transparent Man
 The Albert Square
 Andrew Jackson Jihad
 Ashtray
 Attaboy
 Big D and the Kids Table
 Blatz
 Brickfight
 Dan O'Day (Bopper of River City Rebels)
 dj BC
 Enda
 Filth
 Go Real Slow
 The Groovie Ghoulies
 The Gunshy
 Jason Webley
 Hard Girls
 Mitch Clem
 The New Trust
 Pain
 The Phenomenauts
 The Pillowfights
 Pteradon
 River City Rebels
 The Rum Diary
 The Secretions
 Shang-A-Lang
 Shower with Goats
 Sorry About the Fire
 The Teenage Harlets
 Tera Melos
 The Thorns Of Life
 The Tigermilks
 The Whyioughtas
 The Wunder Years

Other projects
The label has also released compilation CDs and assorted projects featuring bands such as Alkaline Trio, The Ataris, Down By Law, Mates of State, Me First and the Gimme Gimmes, No Use for a Name, Swingin' Utters, Thrice, Tsunami Bomb and Xiu Xiu.

 The Rocky Horror Punk Rock Show compilation album
 Punk Rock Holocaust film
 Punk Rock Strike Vol. 4 compilation for Gogol Bordello
 Pounded miniseries soundtrack

See also 
 List of record labels

References

External links
 Official site
 Silver Sprocket site

Record labels established in 1998
Record labels disestablished in 2007
Defunct record labels of the United States
American independent record labels
Indie rock record labels
Ska record labels
Hardcore record labels